Assumption University is a Roman Catholic university in Windsor, Ontario, Canada federated with the University of Windsor. It was founded in 1857 as Assumption College by the Society of Jesus and incorporated by an Act of the Parliament of Upper Canada, receiving Royal Assent, August 16, 1858. It entered an association with an Ontario university as the Assumption College of the University of Western Ontario (1920-1953) then became the Assumption University of Windsor in 1956, before changing its name again in 1964. When the University of Windsor was established as a secular public university in 1963, Assumption University entered into federation with the newly formed university. Assumption University also remains affiliated with Canterbury College (Anglican) and Iona College (Interfaith). Assumption University is a full member of the Association of Catholic Colleges and Universities in Canada (ACCUC).

Assumption University has its own governance structure with a bicameral system consisting of a Board of Governors and a Senate. While it operates autonomously, Assumption is federated with the University of Windsor. Assumption University has representatives on the University of Windsor's Board of Governors, Senate, and Alumni Board of Directors. It retains its degree-granting powers for graduate studies within the area of theology as well as granting honorary degrees. It offers courses at both the undergraduate and graduate levels. In 2022, Assumption University established a Graduate Diploma in Catholic Studies. 

As a Roman Catholic University, the Chancellor of Assumption University is automatically the Bishop of London. Since 2002, Bishop Ronald Peter Fabbro has served as Chancellor of Assumption University. In 2020, Assumption University appointed Dr. John Cappucci as Principal and Vice-Chancellor. Previous to this appointment, Dr. Cappucci served as Interim Principal from 2019 to 2020. One of Assumption University's most recognized programs is the Christian Culture Series. Since 1941, the Christian Culture Series Gold Medal has been presented to a prominent individual who exemplifies Christian ideals in their daily lives. In 2021, Assumption University marked the 80th anniversary of the Christian Culture Series Gold Medal. The year's recipient was Super Bowl XLVIII champion Luke Willson. Assumption University currently has an active campus ministry program that serves the students at the University of Windsor. Assumption University is home to the Stephen Jarislowsky Chair in Religion and Conflict. The Canadian-Catholic Bioethics Institute at Assumption University (CCBI-A) continues to publish articles and newsletters on bioethics and consult with those with bioethical concerns.

History

Its history dates back to the founding of Assumption College in 1857 by the Society of Jesus (Jesuit) following the growth of their parish at Our Lady of the Assumption established in 1728. Assumption University has been administered by the Congregation of St. Basil since 1870.

In 1919, Assumption College in Windsor affiliated with the University of Western Ontario. Originally, Assumption was one of the largest colleges associated with the University of Western Ontario. In 1934, Holy Names College affiliated with Assumption College and in 1940, a labour school was established at Assumption.

In 1950, Assumption College welcomed its first women students and in 1953, it ended its affiliation with the University of Western Ontario and became an independent institution through an act of the Legislative Assembly of Ontario.

On January 1, 1956, the college changed its name to Assumption University of Windsor and on January 24, 1956 accepted as an affiliate the non-denominational Essex College, the latter established in July 1954 "as an independent college…to provide access to provincial grants."  Holy Names College affiliated in 1956 and Holy Redeemer College in 1957. On November 4, 1957, Canterbury College became the first Anglican college in the world to affiliate with a Roman Catholic University.

In December 1963,  Assumption University, Canterbury College, Holy Redeemer College  (now Académie Sainte-Cécile), and the Iona College (United Church Affiliate), and the University of Windsor joined in an affiliation agreement. "When the University of Windsor began operations on July 1, 1963" ..." Essex College ceased to exist as a corporate entity and its assets were taken over by the University of Windsor." Assumption College in Windsor had incubated and ushered into existence both Assumption University and now, the University of Windsor.

In 2022, as part of its academic revitalization plan, Assumption University restored its Senate rendering the university a bicameral institution. With the Senate in place, Assumption University began to offer courses at both the undergraduate and graduate levels.

Undergraduate Courses 
In March of 2022, Assumption University restored its Senate, which provides oversight over all academic matters. During the Spring 2022 semester, Assumption launched a new undergraduate course entitled, Jerusalem and Rome: Jewish-Catholic Relations. In the Fall 2022 semester, a course on the Holocaust was offered. The course invited guest speakers, including a Holocaust survivor. In 2022, Assumption University became the second Canadian institute of higher learning to become a member of the Council of Centers on Jewish-Christian Relations.

Graduate Courses 
In the Fall of 2022, Assumption University launched a new Graduate Diploma in Catholic Studies. The five-course diploma is taught synchronously online by qualified professors. It received the endorsement of the Bishop of London and Chancellor of Assumption University, Ronald Peter Fabbro. The courses include, Foundations of Catholic Thought, Catholicism and Social Justice, Catholicism and Dialogue, Topics in Catholic Studies, Catholic Studies Capstone Project, and Directed Readings in Catholic Studies. This diploma is advantageous to students seeking employment in the Catholic education, healthcare, or social services sectors. The diploma is considered a hiring asset at several Catholic school boards in the Province of Ontario. In addition, given the program’s flexibility, it fits within the busy schedules of working professionals, particularly teachers, healthcare professionals, and administrators in search of an added graduate credential for possible career advancement. There are four scholarships attached to the diploma, including the Honourable Robert Joseph Comuzzi Scholarship, the Cappucci Scholarship in Christian Studies, the Minotti Scholarship in Christian Studies, the Monsignor L.A. Wnuk Scholarship, and the William E. Kelly Scholarship in Catholic Studies.

Campus Ministry 
For many years, Assumption University has provided Campus Ministry services for the University of Windsor students, faculty and staff. Campus Ministry is a place where life meets faith. They engage the very diverse population of the University of Windsor and have created spaces and programs that promote radical hospitality. They are open to all who want to participate and seek to better the whole person – body, mind and spirit. The dynamic staff provide a comprehensive Campus Ministry program which includes Sunday and weekday Masses and an emphasis on student leadership. Campus Ministry staff are members of Chaplaincy Network, an ecumenical group on campus who also partner with the Muslim Chaplaincy. In 2022, Assumption University's Campus Ministry program partnered with Canterbury College's Campus Ministry program. The bringing together of Catholic and Anglican ministry programs represents a major step forward for ecumenical dialogue.

Stephen Jarislowsky Chair in Religion and Conflict 
The Stephen Jarislowsky Chair in Religion and Conflict was established in 2004 with a generous donation from the Stephen Jarislowsky Foundation and the Basilian Fathers of Sandwich. The current chair is Dr. John Cappucci. Past holders have included, Fr. Paul Rennick, CSB (2004), Fr. Mario D'Souza, CSB (2005), Dr. Martha Lee (2005-2010), and Dr. Norman King (2010-2017). In addition to an active research agenda, the chair is involved in the community providing classes on topics such as the Abrahamic faiths, women and religion, religion and politics, and Catholic-Jewish relations. Each year, the chair invites guest speakers from a variety of religious and spiritual backgrounds to speak about a topic of relevance in the contemporary world. The chair's past speakers have included John Esposito, Andrew Bennett, and Murray Sinclair. In 2019, the chair established the Fr. Paul McGill, CSB Essay Contest for graduating high schools students in the region. In 2021, Dr. Rory Dickson of the University of Winnipeg presented a talk on Sufism. In 2022, the chair partnered with Sandwich First Baptist Church and several other community partners to welcome Dr. Terrence Johnson from Harvard Divinity School.

Fr. Joseph Quinn, CSB Seminar Series in Social Justice 
In 2019, the Fr. Joseph Quinn, CSB Seminar Series in Social Justice was relaunched. This series is named in honour of the late Fr. Joseph Quinn, CSB (1933-2019) who served as Interim President of Assumption University and dedicated his priestly ministry to social justice causes. In the past, this event has historically brought students together to learn about a social justice issue, such as the Holocaust, human trafficking, and the Underground Railroad. In 2020, the topic was the environment with a theme of "the power of one." The event was formally relaunched on April 22, 2021 with environmentalist Simon Jackson of Spirit Bear: The Simon Jackson Story as the keynote speaker. The event attracted over 1,600 students and teachers from across Windsor and Essex County. The 2021 event marked a record-level number of students for the series. In 2022, the series continued with a topic on homelessness in Windsor-Essex and beyond. The session included individuals working to alleviate homelessness in various ways. The 2023 series will take place on April 20, 2023 and focus on the Underground Railroad. The series will be hosted at the historic Sandwich First Baptist Church in Windsor.

Canadian-Catholic Bioethics Institute at Assumption University 
The Canadian-Catholic Bioethics Institute at Assumption University (CCBI-A) provides guidance on bioethical questions as they relate to the teachings of the Roman Catholic faith. The institute publishes two newsletters and consults with members of the community who have a specific question on bioethical matters. The institute is currently under the directorship of Fr. Leo Walsh, CSB.

Fr. Eugene Carlisle LeBel, CSB Award 
The LeBel Award is considered one of Assumption University's most prestigious awards. The award is named in honour of Fr. Eugene Carlisle LeBel, CSB (1899-1986) who served as the last president of Assumption College, first president of Assumption University in 1952, and the first president of the new University of Windsor in 1963. The award is conferred on individuals who have rendered outstanding service to Assumption University. The selection of recipients is at the sole discretion of the principal. The award is not necessarily awarded annually. The last recipient of the LeBel Award was Dr. Carl Cohen, Q.C. in 2022 on the occasion of Assumption University's 165th anniversary.

Christian Culture Series 
The Christian Culture Series was founded in 1934 by Fr. Stanley Murphy, CSB with the purpose of highlighting the role culture plays in contemporary Christian life. The series welcomed prominent speakers from a host of backgrounds and perspectives. In 1941, the Christian Culture Series Gold Medal was established from this program and presented to an individual who exemplifies Christian ideals in his or her daily life. Since its founding in 1941, the gold medal has been conferred upon novelists, poets, historians, academics, politicians, scientists, theologians, and athletes. The gold medal depicts a human hand and a mustard plant with the inscription in Latin, “The Kingdom of Heaven is like a mustard seed” (Matthew 13: 31). The hand suggests the human cooperation expected by God in the coming of the Kingdom. The mustard plant is used by Jesus as a symbol of the Kingdom’s power to grow. On the back of the medal is inscribed the name of the Medalist and the year and the words, “Christian Culture Award, Assumption University.” The university recently announced that the Honourable Graydon Nicholas will receive the gold medal in April 2023.

Past recipients of Christian Culture Series Gold Medal (1941 - ) 

 Sigrid Undset
Jacques Maritain
Henry Ford II
Paul Martin Sr.
Barbara Ward, Baroness Jackson of Lodsworth
Dorothy Day
Marshall McLuhan
Rosemary Haughton
Jean Chrétien
Martin E. Marty
Eugene Whelan
Dominique de Menil
Dennis Archer
Paul Martin
Martin Sheen
Charles Taylor
Cokie Roberts
Luke Willson
Michaëlle Jean

Notable teachers (Assumption College) 

 Frank Anthony DeMarco, coach, professor, multiple administrative appointments: 1946-1986 (retired from the University of Windsor)
 Wyndham Lewis, painter, novelist, critic, poet, playwright, biographer, editor, essayist: Summer, 1943-August 1945
 Marshall McLuhan, educator, philosopher, scholar: 1944-1946
 Paul Martin Sr. (1903–1992), federal politician and statesman: n/a-1935

Notable alumni (Assumption College) 

Fred Thomas (1946-1949), multi-sport (baseball, basketball, football) athlete
Hank Biasatti, multi-sport (NBA basketball, MLB baseball) athlete
Tony Techko, sports historian, teacher

References

Sources
 History of Assumption University

External links

 Assumption University

University of Windsor
Educational institutions established in 1857
1857 establishments in Ontario
Catholic universities and colleges in Canada